Paris to Purple City is an album by Purple City, released in 2005 through Babygrande Records. The album was a collaboration between Purple City members Agallah and Un Kasa and French hip hop artists.

Critical reception
AllMusic wrote that "it's interesting to see an international collaboration from the hustla's point of view." HipHopDX called Paris to Purple City "a stylistically fresh album that is actually way more French than American, although you’d almost never realize it."

Track listing
"Paris to Purple City" – 5:44
"The French Connection" – 5:12
"No War" – 4:20
"Money Rules the World/Ici Bas" – 5:02
"Da Street" – 4:34
"Hip-Hop" – 4:52
"Rap Is All Around the World" – 5:07
"New York/Ville de Lumières" – 4:40
"Baby Girl" – 4:03
"It's Been a Long Way/La RouteEst Longue" – 4:40

References

2005 albums
Babygrande Records albums
Purple City Productions albums
Albums produced by Agallah